The Mount Kapaz or Kepez is a mountain in Lesser Caucasus near Ganja city in central Azerbaijan. Kapaz rises 3,065 meters above the sea level. It is located next to Lake Göygöl and its huge rocks broke off the mount and blocked a nearby river during the 1139 Ganja earthquake; creating the lake. In the Middle Ages, the mount was also called "Alparak", a name borrowed from Alparak lake (now Göygöl) translated from ancient Turkic languages as "the place covered by dam" (Al – below, lower part, space in front of something; parak – dam) referring to the big rocks which blocked the Agsu river and creating a lake.

The glacial meltwater on the mount feed the waters of Göygöl. The famous Göygöl Winery utilizes some of that pure water for production of certains brands of vodka such as "Khan-VIP", "Khan Export" and "Khan Premium" which gained it gold and bronze medals at "United Vodka-2008" competition in Brussels.

Archeological findings of ancient communal items in recent years near Kapaz and Qoshqar mounts and near the Kura River in the vicinity of Ganja confirm the area was a place of early inhabitants.

See also
Ganja, Azerbaijan
Lake Göygöl

Notes

External links
Image of Mount Kapaz from Ganja Executive Power website
Images of Mount Kapaz from day.az

Three-thousanders of the Caucasus
Shahdagh